Arba Minch University (Amharic: አርባምንጭ ዩኒቨርሲቲ) is a residential national university in Arba Minch, Southern Nations, Nationalities, and Peoples' Region, Ethiopia. The Ministry of Education admits qualified students to Arba Minch University based on their score on the Ethiopian Higher Education Entrance Examination.

History 
The nucleus of the university has its origins in the Arba Minch Water Technology Institute (established in September 1986). In 1993, the institute was transferred from the Water Resource Commission to the Ministry of Education.

On 20 September 2004, Arba Minch University was established by government proclamation (Council of Ministers 111/2004). The University originally consisted of Water Technology Institute, Faculty of Engineering, Faculty of Science, Faculty of Social Science and Humanities, and Faculty of business and Economics, and School of Graduate Studies.

Academics
The university runs 74 undergraduate programs, 115 graduate programs, and 27 PhD programs. AMU consists of three institutes, six colleges, and four schools which are situated across the university's six campuses: Main Campus, Abaya Campus, Chamo Campus, Kulfo Campus, and Nech Sar Campus, and Sawla Campus.
Institutes
 Institute of Water Technology
 Institute of Technology
 Institute of Culture & Language Studies
Colleges
 College of Natural & Computational Sciences
 College of Social Sciences and Humanities
 College of Business and Economics
 College of Medicine and Health Sciences (affiliated with Arba Minch General Hospital
 College of Agricultural Sciences
 College of Distance & Continuing Education
Schools
 School of Post Graduate Studies
 School of Law
 School of Public Health
 School of Behavioral & Pedagogical Sciences

References 

Educational institutions established in 1986
1986 establishments in Ethiopia
Universities and colleges in Southern Nations, Nationalities, and Peoples' Region